Drífa Viðar (March 5, 1920 – May 19, 1971) was an Icelandic writer, artist and educator.

The daughter of Einar Viðar and Katrín Norðmann, she was born in Reykjavík. She received her qualifications as a teacher and went on to study art in Reykjavík, New York City and Paris. Drífa contributed literary criticism to the feminist publication Melkorka during the 1960s. She published her first novel Fjalldalslilja in 1967. A short story collection Dagar við vatnið was published in 1971 after her death.

She married Skúil Thoroddsen, a doctor; the couple had four children.

See also 

 List of Icelandic writers
 Icelandic literature

References 

1920 births
1971 deaths
Drifa Vidar
Drifa Vidar
Drifa Vidar
Drifa Vidar
Drífa Viðar
Drífa Viðar
Icelandic expatriates in the United States
Icelandic expatriates in France